Brian Ainscough is a soccer coach, who last coached the men's soccer team at Northeastern University from 2005 to 2014. He compiled a 79-80-33 overall record, including a 27-16-12 mark in conference play. He transformed the Huskies soccer program into one of the best in the CAA, posting four straight top 5 finishes in conference play. His best success came in 2009, when the team went 10–8–1, including an 8–3–1 mark in conference play. He has led the team to back-to-back finals appearances in the CAA tournament, narrowly missing the NCAA tournament both years.

He was previously the head men's soccer coach at Providence College, where he coached the Friars for four years. He turned around the Friars program, which was then considered one of the worst in the Big East, and guided them to a 9–9–1 record his final year. In 1998, his Friars made the Big East tournament for the first time in over a decade. He started his coaching career as an assistant at Villanova University in 1991. From 1992 to 1994, he coached under Ed Kelly at Boston College.

External links
http://www.gonu.com/coaches.aspx?rc=80&path=msoc

Boston College Eagles men's soccer coaches
Northeastern Huskies men's soccer coaches
Providence Friars men's soccer coaches
Villanova Wildcats men's soccer coaches
Living people
Year of birth missing (living people)
Republic of Ireland football managers
Fairleigh Dickinson Knights men's soccer players
New Jersey Eagles players
Penn-Jersey Spirit players
Bowdoin Polar Bears men's soccer coaches
Republic of Ireland expatriate association footballers
Republic of Ireland expatriate football managers
Expatriate soccer managers in the United States
Expatriate soccer players in the United States
Irish expatriate sportspeople in the United States
Republic of Ireland association footballers
Association footballers not categorized by position